Nordin Wooter (born 24 August 1976) is a Dutch former professional footballer who played as a right-winger.

Club career
Wooter was born in Breda, and started playing at OSV and AVV Zeeburgia before joining the youth academy of Ajax. He entered the Ajax first team at the time of the successes between 1994 and 1996 where he became the national champion twice and won the UEFA Champions League with the team. On 17 April 1996, he became the first teenager ever to score in a UEFA Champions League semi-final. This happened during the 1995–96 season in an away match against Panathinaikos, in which Wooter scored the third and last goal after two previous goals by Jari Litmanen.

A spell at La Liga side Real Zaragoza followed, before in 1999 Wooter joined English Premier League club Watford for a then club-record fee of £950,000. He made his debut for Watford in a memorable 1–0 win over Chelsea, and went on to score three goals for the club, against Leicester City, Norwich City and Wimbledon.

After short periods at RBC Roosendaal and Braga, he was successful in 2004 with Anorthosis Famagusta in Cyprus. He was taken over by Panathinaikos during the 2004–05 season. In the 2006–07 season he played for Sivasspor and a season later he ended his playing career with AEK Larnaca.

International career
Wooter was a member of the Dutch squad at the 1995 FIFA World Youth Championship. For the Netherlands U17 he made eight appearances scoring two goals. For the Netherlands U19 he made 23 appearances scoring seven goals. For the Netherlands U21 he made 15 appearances scoring five goals.

Post-playing career
From 2010 to 2012 Wooter was chairman of FC New Amsterdam, which emerged from SC Nieuwendam, which was formed in 2004 from a merger, and his organization 'Masters of the Game', where he works together with his former Ajax teammates Kiki Musampa and Tarik Oulida. He was declared bankrupt in 2011 and the club followed suit a year later. Since 2012 he has been working as a technique trainer for the youngest youth players at Ajax. In January 2019 he was appointed coach of FC Lienden.

By the end of 2014 Wooter together with David Endt managed a FIFA supported project for the Surinamese Football Association (S.V.B.) where the football school of Wooter in the Netherlands has the delegated authority from the S.V.B. to map out players of Surinamese descent and to interest them in coming out for the Suriname national team.

References

External links

Nordin Wooter profile at Dutch Players Abroad
Tribute by Ian Grant at Blind, Stupid and Desperate

1976 births
Living people
Dutch sportspeople of Surinamese descent
Dutch footballers
Footballers from Breda
Association football wingers
AFC Ajax players
Watford F.C. players
RBC Roosendaal players
AEK Larnaca FC players
Anorthosis Famagusta F.C. players
Panathinaikos F.C. players
Real Zaragoza players
Sivasspor footballers
S.C. Braga players
A.V.V. Zeeburgia players
Eredivisie players
La Liga players
Premier League players
English Football League players
Primeira Liga players
Süper Lig players
Super League Greece players
Cypriot First Division players
Netherlands under-21 international footballers
Netherlands youth international footballers
Dutch expatriate footballers
Dutch expatriate sportspeople in Spain
Expatriate footballers in Spain
Dutch expatriate sportspeople in England
Expatriate footballers in England
Dutch expatriate sportspeople in Portugal
Expatriate footballers in Portugal
Dutch expatriate sportspeople in Cyprus
Expatriate footballers in Cyprus
Dutch expatriate sportspeople in Greece
Expatriate footballers in Greece
Dutch expatriate sportspeople in Turkey
Expatriate footballers in Turkey
AFC Ajax non-playing staff